Agrotis evanescens is a moth of the family Noctuidae. It was first described by Walter Rothschild in 1894. It is endemic to the Hawaiian island of Laysan.

External links

Agrotis
Endemic moths of Hawaii
Moths described in 1894